This is a list of the National Register of Historic Places in Jones County, Texas.

This is intended to be a complete list of properties listed on the National Register of Historic Places in Jones County, Texas. There are 22 properties listed on the National Register in the county. Three of these are also Recorded Texas Historic Landmarks.

Current listings

The locations of National Register properties may be seen in a mapping service provided.

|}

See also

National Register of Historic Places listings in Texas
Recorded Texas Historic Landmarks in Jones County

References

External links

Registered Historic Places
Jones County
Buildings and structures in Jones County, Texas